RNLB William and Kate Johnston (ON 682) was a  lifeboat stationed at New Brighton in the English county of Cheshire from the summer of 1923 until 1950. The lifeboat was designed as a prototype by James R. Barnett who was a consulting naval architect to the Royal National Lifeboat Institution. She was the first Barnett-class lifeboat and at the time of her launch, she was the largest lifeboat in the world.

Design and construction
This new design of motor lifeboat was a radical departure from previous RNLI rescue boats. The William and Kate Johnston was pushed through the water with twin propellers which were housed in tunnels. To drive these propellers there were two new D.E. six-cylinder submersible petrol engines of 80 horsepower. Each engine was housed in its own chamber, with entirely separate fuel and cooling systems. Each of these was watertight and was capable of running if the engine room became flooded and the engine was entirely submerged. The engines air intakes were set well above the waterline even when the boat was waterlogged. The class was also the first RNLI that rely solely on its engines for its motive power although the Barnett was equipped with a small staysail and trysail for stability purposes.

Hull construction
The hull was constructed of timber and was divided into fifteen watertight compartments. The lifeboat was also the first motor lifeboat to be built with flush decks, similar to earlier steam driven lifeboats. There was a semi enclosed deck shelter which housed the on deck helm position which helped to keep the crew out of bad weather launches. Below deck there was also a cabin which could accommodate up to twenty four people. If necessary the Barnett class lifeboat was capable of caring a total of 130 rescued people.

References

1923 ships
Barnett-class lifeboats
Ships and vessels on the National Register of Historic Vessels
New Brighton, Merseyside